The Citizens Coalition for Change (CCC) is a Zimbabwean political party led by politician and lawyer Nelson Chamisa and its official spokesperson is Fadzayi Mahere. It was established on 22 January 2022 and was announced on 24 January 2022 at a press conference at Bronte Hotel in Harare.

Background
Nelson Chamisa formed Citizens Coalition for Change after losing the squabbles over party name "MDC Alliance". The president of the CCC party presented yellow as the new color and raising the index finger as the new symbol. CCC has no constitution. A way to avoid being bound by its supremacy as it was in MDC. After forming the party, most MDC Alliance MPs and councilors who showed allegiance to Chamisa were recalled from parliament by Douglas Mwonzora, who took over MDC Alliance. This, together with some deaths of officials, called for by-elections in 28 seats which were conducted on 26 March 2022 in which the newly formed CCC won 19 and ZANU–PF won 9. It is worthy noting that ZANU-PF gained 9 more parliamentary seats since 2018. The rump MDC Alliance which Mwonzora headed did not win a seat. Weeks before the by-election saw some government-sponsored violence against CCC (including violence at CCC rally in Kwekwe which led to the death of a party supporter), unjustified behavior from the Zimbabwe Republic Police which include banning of CCC rallies, beating up of party supporters, arrests of CCC party officials (of note, Tendai Biti and Madzibaba Veshanduko), etc.

Electoral history

House of Assembly elections

References

 
Political parties in Zimbabwe
Political parties established in 2022
Zimbabwean democracy movements
Social democratic parties in Africa